Phylaki is a modern village and the archaeological site of an ancient Minoan cemetery on Crete.

Archaeology
The site, discovered in 1981, is a Late Minoan IIIA tholos tomb.  At least 9 burials were made here.

Artefacts found included a gold necklace which contained 28 rosettes of gold, fifteen seal stones, amulets, bronze weapons and bronze utensils.  Ivory decorations from a wooden box include: the heads of warriors in boar's tusk helmets, Plaques found are decorated with wild goats, sphinxes and "figure of eight" shields.

This area was used as a dump sight for the town, which may have preserved it from damage to the smaller items that were hidden under the trash and animal bodies.

References
 Swindale, Ian "Phylaki" Retrieved 11 Feb 2006

External links
 http://www.minoancrete.com/phylaki.htm

1981 archaeological discoveries
Minoan sites in Crete
Tombs in Greece
Beehive tombs